The Linker for activation of T cells, also known as linker of activated T cells or LAT, is a protein involved in the T-cell antigen receptor signal transduction pathway which in humans is encoded by the LAT gene. Alternative splicing results in multiple transcript variants encoding different isoforms.

Function 

The LAT protein encoded by the gene of the same name, plays a key role in the diversification of T cell signaling pathways following activation of the T-cell antigen receptor (TCR) signal transduction pathway, which is first catalyzed by TCR binding to MHC class II. LAT is a transmembrane protein localizes to lipid rafts (also known as glycosphingolipid-enriched microdomains or GEMs) and acts as a docking site for SH2 domain-containing proteins. Upon phosphorylation, this protein recruits multiple adaptor proteins and downstream signaling molecules into multimolecular signaling complexes located near the site of TCR engagement. In mouse thymocytes, lack of functional LAT or the inability for LAT to be phosphorylated leads to complete lack of T cell development. Moreover, mutation and deletion of LAT hampers overall TCR mediated T cell response.

Signaling Pathway 
Prior to phosphorylation of LAT, the TCR signal transduction pathway is initiated by a TCR interacting with peptide bound MHC, and immediately leads to the activation of LCK and Fyn, which are members of the Src family of kinases. Activated LCK subsequently phosphorylates the immunoreceptor tyrosine-based activation motifs (ITAMs) of the T-cell surface glycoprotein CD3 zeta chain, which is a protein associated with the TCR complex, in two specific locations. The phosphorylated ITAMs of the CD3 zeta chain allows for ZAP-70, a Syk family protein tyrosine kinase, to bind, become activated, and phosphorylate LAT.

ZAP-70 phosphorylates tyrosines on LAT, specifically tyrosines 171, 191, and 226 is able to interact with adaptor proteins that have a SH2 domain, and are members of the Grb2 protein family, such as Gads. Moreover, phosphorylation of LAT tyrosine 132 allows for  PLCγ1-LAT association, which, when combined with concurrent Gads binding to tyrosines 171 or 191 of LAT, allows for the formation of a LAT-nucleated signaling complex. LAT-interacting Gads attracts the binding of SLP-76, which recruits additional effector molecules that assist in the stabilization of  PLCγ1 binding to the LAT complex. The resulting LAT signaling complex, which contains the molecules  PLCγ1, Grb2, Gads, SLP-76 and the necessary associated ligands thus allow for diversification of the TCR signaling pathway through actin production, the activation of transcription factors, and other messaging signals.

Discovery 

LAT was described in the early 1990s as a phosphoprotein of 36–38 kDa (pp. 36–38) rapidly phosphorylated on tyrosine residues following TCR ligation. Cloning of the gene revealed that the protein product is a type III (leaderless) transmembrane protein of 262 aminoacids (long form) or 233 aminoacids (short form) in humans, 242 aminoacids in mouse, and 241 aminoacids in rat.

Interactions 

The Linker for Activation of T cells has been shown to interact with:

 GRAP2, 
 GRAP, 
 Grb2, 
 ITK, 
 MAP4K1 
 PIK3R1, 
 PLCG1, 
 SHB, 
 VAV1, and
 ZAP-70.

References

Further reading 

 
 
 
 
 
 
 
 
 
 
 
 
 
 
 
 
 
 
 
 

Transmembrane proteins